Srivinay Salian (born 13 June 1976 in Mumbai, India) is an Indian television and film writer and an independent filmmaker.

Srivinay Salian (aka Sreevinay Salian) started his career with Percept Picture Company, as an animation script writer for their show, 'New Adventures of Hanuman'. Later, he went on to write other animation teleseries, such as Chatur Chetan for Dreams Studio (Hyderabad, India) and Howzzattt series for Toonz Animation. Chatur Chetan, received the Best TV Series 2013 award at the 24FPS International Animation Awards festival.

Srivinay Salian has co-produced an independent film titled, Red Gold, along with Gray Area Productions (LA, USA). Red Gold is a social  crime drama written and directed by an American filmmaker, Michael Keller. Red Gold was profiled in New Jersey Stage and is set to premiere at the Garden State Film Festival in Atlantic City, N.J. on Saturday, 5 April.

Srivinay Salian was also the writer for Off Road with Gul Panag, an infotainment adventure documentary hosted by Gul Panag on the Discovery Channel.

Srivinay Salian has also written two episodes for the Horror TV Series, Fear Files 2, titled Mangalik and Ghunghroo, produced by BBC Worldwide India. The show was aired in 2015 on Zee TV, a prime entertainment channel in India.

He has written a short story (mini novel) titled, The Shoelace, which is "a psychological & metaphysical thriller".

Srivinay is also Writer & Director of a Short Film title 'Stripped', which explores the Women Objectification issue in the society, by way of Ogling. Hindustan Times, Bhopal, reported that the film had gone viral shortly after its release on YouTube.

His short experimental film, Main Hindustaan Hoon ~ I am India, received very positive critical reviews from viewers as well as independent online news portal - india.com.
 

Richard Propes of The Independent Critic reviewed Stripped as a thought-provoking short film.

He is also the screenwriter of Adventures of Appu & Gappu, a 3D Animation film, produced by Magic Wand Animation.

Feature films
Hacked (2020) (as Dialogue Writer)
Ghost (2019) (as Dialogue Writer) 
Rakkhosh (as Writer & Co-Director)
Red Gold (Producer).
Adventures of Appu & Gappu (Screenwriter).

Web series
Twisted 2 
Maaya 2
Zakhmi
Zindabaad (as Dialogue Writer) 
Unafraid (Season 2)

TV shows
Off Road with Gul Panag (Season 1)
Fear Files 2 (Zee TV)

Teleserials (animation)
New Adventures of Hanuman (Season 1,2)
Chatur Chetan (Season 1)
Howzzattt (Season 1)

Short films
Stripped (Writer/Director).
Tezaab (Director/Editor).
Main Hindustan Hoon (Director/Editor).
Blue Brave Heart (Writer/Director/Cinematographer/Editor).

Literary works
 (Fiction)

References

External links

Srivinay Salian's Official Website
Srivinay Salian's Blog
Interview on StoryV Travel & Lifestyle
Interview on appleforA.com

1976 births
Living people
Screenwriters from Mumbai
Indian male novelists
Hindi-language writers
Indian male screenwriters
Indian male short story writers
Film producers from Mumbai
Film directors from Mumbai